Cobbinbil Parish, New South Wales is a bounded rural locality and a civil parish of Cowen County, New South Wales.

The parish is on Cobbinbil, Baronesse and Gulargambone Creeks west of Gulargambone.

The parish is on the traditional lands of the Weilwan Aboriginal people.

References

Localities in New South Wales
Geography of New South Wales